Foreign relations of Djibouti are managed by the Djiboutian Ministry of Foreign Affairs and International Cooperation. Djibouti maintains close ties with the governments of Somalia, Ethiopia, France and the United States. It is likewise an active participant in African Union, United Nations, Non-Aligned Movement, Organisation of Islamic Cooperation and Arab League affairs.

Bilateral relations

Africa

Americas

Asia

Europe

Oceania

International organisations
Djibouti is a member of the African Union, Arab League, La Francophonie, Port Management Association of Eastern and Southern Africa, and the United Nations.

In 1996, the Intergovernmental Authority on Development (IGAD), a developmental organisation of seven countries in East Africa, established its headquarters in Djibouti City. IGAD's mandate is for regional cooperation and economic integration.

After the terror attacks of 11 September 2001, Djibouti joined the Global War on Terror. It is now home to the Camp Lemonnier military compound.

Djibouti is also a member of the International Criminal Court with a Bilateral Immunity Agreement of protection for the US-military (as covered under Article 98).

See also
List of diplomatic missions in Djibouti
List of diplomatic missions of Djibouti
Ministry of Foreign Affairs and International Cooperation (Djibouti)

Notes

References

External links
Embassy of the United States in Djibouti